is the fifth single by Bump of Chicken. The title track is from the album .

Track listing
All tracks written by Fujiwara Motoo.
 — 5:07
 — 3:26
"Tinpost: Uncle On (Hidden track) — 2:59

Personnel
Fujiwara Motoo — Guitar, vocals
Masukawa Hiroaki — Guitar
Naoi Yoshifumi — Bass
Masu Hideo — Drums

Chart performance

References

External links
スノースマイル on the official Bump of Chicken website.

2002 singles
Bump of Chicken songs